Z103 is the on-air brand name of several radio stations in Canada and the United States. Stations using this identifier broadcast within the 102.9 to 103.9 range on FM radio, and usually (but not always) have the letter Z in their call sign as the final letter.

Although the letter Z is normally pronounced "zed" in Canada, Canadian "Z103" stations usually use the American "zee" pronunciation as it rhymes with "three".

Stations using this identifier include:

Canada
 CIDC-FM, in Orangeville, Ontario

United States
 KFTZ, in Idaho Falls, Idaho
 WXZZ, in Lexington, Kentucky, also known as Z-Rock 103

Former stations
 CKMM-FM, in Winnipeg, Manitoba
 CHNO-FM, in Sudbury, Ontario was formerly called Z103 from 2000 - 2006
 KSBZ in Sitka, Alaska
 WMGV, in Newport, North Carolina
 WNND, in Lancaster, Ohio
 WVKO-FM, in Johnstown, Ohio
 WWOF, in Tallahassee, Florida
 WZVA, in Marion, Virginia
 CKHZ-FM, in Halifax, Nova Scotia was formerly called Z103 from 2006 to 2012 (Now Hot Country 103.5)